Vessels (stylized as ▽ESSELS) is the second studio album by American rock band Starset, released on January 20, 2017 through Razor & Tie.

The album peaked at number 11 on the Billboard 200. The first single from the album, "Monster", peaked at number 2 on the Billboard Mainstream Rock Songs chart in May 2017, becoming the band's highest-charting song to date. The second single, "Satellite", peaked at number 12 on the same chart in November 2017. A deluxe edition of the album titled Vessels 2.0 was released on September 28, 2018.

Writing and recording
Frontman Dustin Bates outlines the process for creating the album:

Work on the album started as early as June 2015. Bates estimates that it took collectively 9 months to create the album, with small interspersed breaks for touring in support of the band's prior album, Transmissions.

Composition and sound
Bates described the album's sound in comparison to their prior album, Transmissions:

Vessels has been described as hard rock, electronic rock, and progressive rock, by professional critics. Bates also stated he implemented some elements of EDM into the music.

Reception

The album was strongly praised by Loudwire, stating that "Vessels works on multiple levels. If you're looking for engaging singular tracks to fill your playlist, this album has several songs that could keep the band on radio for a long run. But if you're looking for a deeper connection and a full listening experience, Vessels truly takes the listener on a journey both musically and thematically, utilising synths, drums, guitars and Bates' at times dreamlike, at other times aggressive vocal approach." The lead single from the album "Monster" also received particular praise for its blend of hard rock with electronic elements, and was featured in many decade end rock songs lists.

Track listing

Personnel

Musicians 
 Dustin Bates – vocals, guitars, additional programming
 Rob Graves – programming, guitars
 Alex Niceforo – programming
 Igor Khoroshev – programming, strings and orchestra arrangements
 Josh Baker – additional programming
 Paul Trust – additional programming
 Ron DeChant – additional backing vocals
 Joe Rickard – drums
 David Davidson – violin
 David Angell – violin
 Elizabeth Lamb – viola
 Anthony Lamarchina – cello

Technical 
 Rob Graves – production, engineering
 Ben Grosse – mixing
 Bob Ludwig – mastering
 Mike Plotnikoff – engineering
 Justin Spotswood – engineering
 Paul Decarli – digital editing
 Joe Rickard – digital editing, additional pre-production
 Josh Baker – additional pre-production
 Sahaj Ticotin – additional pre-production
 Paul Trust – additional pre-production

Charts

Weekly charts

Year-end charts

References

2017 albums
Starset albums
Razor & Tie albums